The reticulate blind snake (Epacrophis reticulatus) is a species of snake in the family Leptotyphlopidae. It is endemic to Somalia.

References

Epacrophis
Snakes of Africa
Reptiles of Somalia
Endemic fauna of Somalia
Reptiles described in 1906
Taxa named by George Albert Boulenger
Somali montane xeric woodlands